Sergei Kulbach (born 24 November 1992) is a Ukrainian pair skater. He won national titles with former partners Elizaveta Usmantseva and Natalja Zabijako. With Zabijako, he also competed at the 2011 World Championships, placing 16th.

Career 
From 2008–2009, Kulbach competed with Anna Khnychenkova for Ukraine.

In 2010, Kulbach teamed up with Natalja Zabijako to represent Estonia. After debuting at the 2010 Nebelhorn Trophy, the pair placed 13th at the 2011 European Championships and 16th at the 2011 World Championships. Zabijako injured her back as a result of a fall at the NRW Trophy in December 2011, preventing them from competing at the 2012 European Championships. On 15 February 2012, it was reported that Zabijako and Kulbach had parted ways and he had returned to Ukraine.

In 2012, Kulbach teamed up with Elizaveta Usmantseva to compete for Ukraine but their partnership was short-lived.

Programs

With Zabijako

With Khnychenkova

Competitive highlights 
JGP: Junior Grand Prix

With Usmantseva for Ukraine

With Zabijako for Estonia

With Khnychenkova for Ukraine

References

External links 

 
 
 

Ukrainian male pair skaters
Estonian male pair skaters
1992 births
Living people
Sportspeople from Dnipro